CBLB may refer to:

 CBLB (gene)
 CBLB (AM), a radio retransmitter (1340 AM) licensed to serve Schreiber, Ontario, Canada